Bočinja may refer to:

 Donja Bočinja, a village in the municipality of Maglaj, Bosnia and Herzegovina
 Gornja Bočinja, a village in the municipality of Maglaj, Bosnia and Herzegovina